This article is related to roads in Cape Verde. There are three categories of national roads (EN1, EN2, EN3), rural roads (ER) and municipal roads (EM). Municipal roads are managed by the municipalities, the national and rural roads are managed by the Instituto de Estradas. The total length of the national road network is 1,113 km; the total length of the municipal road networks is 537 km. Of the national roads, 36% (by length) is asphalted. EN1 are first class national roads, EN2 are second class national roads and EN3 are third class national roads. Next is the first two letters which represent the island abbreviation, then the number. Only national roads are listed below.

Boa Vista

Brava

Fogo

Maio

Sal

Santiago

Santo Antão

São Nicolau

São Vicente

See also
 Transport in Cape Verde
 List of countries by road network size
 List of roads and highways

References

External links
- Instituto de Estradas (Institute of Roads)'s website 

 
Roads